Listen Without Prejudice is the debut international studio album and sixth studio album overall of Filipina singer-actress Regine Velasquez. It was released in 1994 in the Philippines by Polycosmic Records and  distributed there by Mercury Records; in other parts of Asia, including Hong Kong, Japan, China, Taiwan, Indonesia and Thailand, the album was released by PolyGram Records. Velasquez was the second Filipina artist to be signed on an international record label; the first was Lea Salonga, through Atlantic Records in 1993. The album's lead single "In Love With You" features Cantonese singer Jacky Cheung. Listen Without Prejudice has sold more than 700,000 copies worldwide, including 100,000 in the Philippines, making it the best-selling album of Velasquez's career to date.

Track listing

Personnel
Credits taken from Listen Without Prejudice liner notes

Winifred Lai – art direction and image design
Lawrence Ng – photography
Ray Chan of Orient 4 – hair
Boom! – make-up
Ida Henares – voice image coach
Louisa Ling – album coordinator
Primeline Inc. – management
Regine Velasquez – lead vocals, background vocals, album producer
Jacky Cheung – guest vocals, background vocals
Babsie Molina – background vocals
Sylvia Macaraeg – background vocals
Michael Au – producer, recording engineer, mixing
Chito Ilagan – album producer, producer, co-producer, background vocal arrangement
John Laudon – writer, keyboard and guitar
Hung Wang Leung – strings, keyboard
Vistine Pettis – saxophone
Lam Wing Cheung – recording engineer
Alex Yang – producer, arranger, mixing, mastering
Patrick Delay – arranger
Gary Kum – arranger
Danny Chan – guitar
Rico Cristobal – piano
Robert Porter – recording engineer, mixing, mastering
Frankie – recording engineer, mixing, mastering
Chiu Tsang Hei – arranger, background vocals
Ferment So – guitars
Ronnie Henares – album producer, producer
Alvin Nunez – music and arrangement
Jun Dela Paz – recording engineer
Joseph LP – producer, mixing
Ryan Cayabyab – orchestral adaptation and re-arrangement
Lorrie Ilustre – music and programming
Waymon Chapman – writer, rap
Richard Yuen – arranger, piano
Melcho – drums
Steve – bass
Jim – guitars
Clement Pong – recording engineer
Romeo Diaz –  arranger
Ricky Cortes – producer, recording engineer
Homer Flores – music and track arrangement
Voltaire P. Opriano – recording engineer

Certifications

Release history

See also
 Regine Velasquez discography

References 

Regine Velasquez albums
1994 albums